"Free Yourself" is a song recorded by English singer-songwriter Jessie Ware, released on 19 July 2022 as the first single from her fifth studio album, That! Feels Good! It was written by Ware, Clarence Coffee Jr. and the song's producer Stuart Price.

Background and release 
"Free Yourself" is Ware's first single since the 2021 release of the extended Platinum Pleasure Edition of her most recent album What's Your Pleasure?.

During her headline set on The Park stage at the Glastonbury Festival 2022, the song was debuted. It was later premiered on 19 July 2022 as the "Hottest Record in the World" on BBC Radio 1's Future Sounds show.

In a statement released to the press following the song's release, Ware said that this track "is the beginning of a new era" and that she's "so excited for people to have this song for the end of their summer; to dance, to feel no inhibitions, and to feel joyful because that's how I've been feeling recently being able to tour again and being able to sing again".

Four remixes of the single were subsequently released. The first was by Paul Woolford and was released on 12 August 2022. The second was by Eats Everything and was released on 19 August. The third was by the Alias and was released on 16 September. The fourth was by Melanie C and was released on 3 November.

Production and composition 

A predominantly Italo disco-house track, "Free Yourself" is produced by Stuart Price and co-written by Ware, Price and Clarence Coffee Jr. of the production team the Monsters & Strangerz. In an interview with Clara Amfo following the song's premiere on BBC Radio 1, Ware mentioned how she was initially hesitant to work with Price due to "being in a bubble with James Ford" (who she had worked with previously for What's Your Pleasure?).

Strong keyboard stabs reminiscent of the diva house genre start off the song, before building up and being accompanied with a selection of strings, brass instruments and drums, all acting as a background to Ware's vocals. The refrain of the song urges the listener to "hold steady through life's turbulence": "Keep on moving up that mountain top [...] If it feels so good then baby, baby don't you".

Music video 
The music video for the single was released on 8 August 2022 at 5pm GMT. It was directed by Vicky Lawton, who had previously directed the videos for previous singles "Save A Kiss" and "What's Your Pleasure?". The video sees Ware sport an "extravagant ruby red dress", leading a congregation of dancers at a stately home through a ritualistic lecture of self-love and appreciation.

In an interview with Little Black Book, Lawton described the video as "very '70s rock 'n' roll, but with a pinch of the occult thrown in. Knowing I’d want to make the tone provocative, I needed to ensure there was the class and sophistication in the visuals to keep it chic. That meant keeping mystery and intrigue at the forefront, using references of decadence, silhouettes to tease and a heavenly glow throughout." Rob Jarvis was the director of photography for the shoot and Lawton described working with him as a "delightful experience".

Critical reception 
The song was generally well-received by critics.

George Griffiths from the Official Charts Company said the single "bursts out of  shadow, as it should do" and that "this is a track clearly inspired by several motifs; CeCe Peniston, Erotica-era Madonna ('Deeper and Deeper' especially) and Studio 54 as the rent ran out and they were closing the shutters for the final time".

Wren Graves from Consequence said that the song "opens with marching keyboards that add an air of drama before the beat drops", whilst Tomás Mier from Rolling Stone described the lyrics as "sexy" and the chorus as "infectious [and] funky". Pitchfork's Eric Torres calls the single "a sauntering floorfiller [...] eventually spinning out into a delirious breakdown in its last minute".

The song subsequently went on to feature in various year-end rankings, including Pitchfork in their "The 100 Best Songs of 2022" list at number 49, with Jesse Dorris adding the track "takes Ware’s blend of ’70s disco and ’80s boogie and shimmies it ecstatically into the ’90s [...] without losing an ounce of charm." Billboard also added the song to their "The 100 Best Songs of 2022: Staff List" at number 33 and "The 50 Best Dance Songs of 2022: Critics’ Picks" list with it being described as "uncut dancefloor mania".

Track listings 
Digital download

 Free Yourself – 3:58

Digital download - Paul Woolford Remix
 Free Yourself (Paul Woolford Remix) – 3:01
 Free Yourself – 3:59

Digital download - Eats Everything Remix

 Free Yourself (Eats Everything Remix) – 4:03
 Free Yourself (Paul Woolford Remix) – 3:01
 Free Yourself – 3:58

Digital download - The Alias Remix

 Free Yourself (The Alias Remix) - 3:12
 Free Yourself – 3:58
 Free Yourself (Eats Everything Remix) – 4:03
 Free Yourself (Paul Woolford Remix) – 3:01

Digital download - Melanie C Remix

 Free Yourself (Melanie C Remix) - 5:11

Credits and personnel 
Credits adapted from YouTube.

 Jessie Ware – vocals, songwriter
 Stuart Price – producer, songwriter, recording engineer, mixer, background vocals, piano, bass, guitar, keyboards, drums
 Clarence Coffee Jr – background vocals, songwriter 
 Stuart Hawkes – mastering engineer
 Atlantic Horns – horns

Charts

References 

Jessie Ware songs
2022 songs
2022 singles
Songs written by Jessie Ware
Songs written by Clarence Coffee Jr.
Songs written by Stuart Price
Song recordings produced by Stuart Price
EMI Records singles